Crimes Are To Be Paid is a 1972 Taiwanese and Hong Kong film.

Cast
 O Chun Hung
 Tien Feng
 Tien Ni
 Wang Lai
 Chan Chun
 Maang Lee
 Zhu Mu
 Kong Ban
 Wong Chung Shun

References

1972 films
Taiwanese action films
Hong Kong action films
1970s action films
1970s Mandarin-language films
1970s Hong Kong films